Henry Portman was a housing developer.

Henry Portman may also refer to:

Henry Portman, 2nd Viscount Portman (1829–1919), English Liberal MP
Henry Seymour Portman (1637–1728), English MP
Henry Berkeley Portman, 3rd Viscount Portman (1860–1923)
Sir Henry Portman, 2nd Baronet (died 1623) of the Portman baronets